Derek Hardiman (born 1981) is an Irish sportsman. He plays in the right wing-back position on the Galway senior hurling team.

Derek Hardiman hails from the Mullagh Gaelic Athletic Association club in County Galway.  He has been playing senior hurling with Galway for several years now and has won a National Hurling League title with the side in 2004.  Hardiman played in the 2005 All-Ireland Hurling Final against Cork, but only ended up with a runners-up medal.  He was named on the All-Stars team in the same year.

References

1981 births
Living people
Galway inter-county hurlers
Mullagh hurlers